St John the Evangelist's Church was an Anglican parish church in Turncroft, Over Darwen, Lancashire, England. It was paid for by a Mrs Graham, and designed by the Lancaster architect E. G. Paley. The church cost £8,000 (equivalent to £ in ). The church has since been closed and demolished.

See also

List of ecclesiastical works by E. G. Paley

References

External links
Photograph of the village street showing the church

Former Church of England church buildings
Gothic Revival church buildings in England
Gothic Revival architecture in Lancashire
Churches completed in 1864
19th-century Church of England church buildings
Church buildings by E. G. Paley
John, Turncroft
Former churches in Lancashire